Das Spielhaus (The Playhouse) was a popular puppet theatre television series that played on the second channel of Deutscher Fernsehfunk in the former East Germany.

The eight residents of a mobile house with twelve wheels experienced fantastic adventures together. The character Knollo often created inventions that ended in explosions, while Schlapper was more sceptical and timid. Together with the vain Defifé and the brilliant Masine, the series featured other colourful characters.

Characters 

 Masine (caring girl with red hair) 
 Kleiner (cheeky boy with a snub nose)
 Laribum (somewhat chubby artist)
 Kniffo (cosmonaut)
 Knollo (inventor)
 Defifé (vain and moody girl with long red hair)  
 Casimir (clever cat)
 Schlapperplapper (a sheep)

Cast

Crew 
 Redaction: Rita Hatzius, Bärbel Möllendorf, Gerdamarie Preuße
 Dramaturgy: Bärbel Möllendorf, Rita Hatzius, Helga Krecek
 Manager: Antje Geiger
 Production Manager: Eckhard Grosch, Doris Kocks, Christina Eggert
 Assistant director: Camilla Meyer
 Director: , Wolfgang Genth
 Lyrics: Andreas Turowski
 Music: ,

External links 
 
 Poster of this series at TheTVDB

German television shows featuring puppetry
Television in East Germany
German children's television series
1982 German television series debuts
1991 German television series endings
German-language television shows